Trisur Rinpoche Jetsun Lungrik Namgyal, also known as Khensur Lungri Namgyel, was born in 1927 in Kham (eastern Tibet) was the 101st Gaden Tripa, the leader of the Gelug sect of Tibetan Buddhism.

Ordained at eight years old, Venerable Rinpoche Lungrik Namgyal acquired the title of Geshe Lharampa and Geshe Ngarampa (specialist in tantra) after forty years of intensive study and practice in all fields of Buddhist sutra and tantra including the Five Major Treatises of Buddhist Philosophy, as well as an extraordinary monastic education which included numerous sacred rituals.

See also
Ganden Monastery

References

External links
Thar Deu Ling official web site
 

1927 births
Ganden Tripas
Gelug Lamas
Living people
Lamas from Tibet
20th-century lamas
Tibetan Buddhists from France
Rinpoches
French people of Tibetan descent